Fuzhen (符珍; died 1909), also known as Ruiyu, born of the Manchu Guwalgiya clan, was a noble of the Qing dynasty. He was a member of the Bordered Yellow Banner of the Qing dynasty's Eight Banners, and a direct descendant of Fiongdon (費英東), who served under the Qing dynasty's founder Nurhaci. Fuzhen held the hereditary title of First Class Duke Xiongyong (一等雄勇公). In 1873 he married the Xianfeng Emperor's daughter Gurun Princess Rong'an and was granted the title of Prince Consort (額駙).

References

1909 deaths
Qing dynasty politicians
Manchu politicians
Year of birth missing